Explorer of the Seas is a  owned and operated by Royal Caribbean International, completed in 2000. She can accommodate over 3,000 guests, including scientists making use of a built-in atmospheric and oceanographic laboratory operated by the University of Miami's Rosenstiel School of Marine and Atmospheric Science. The lab, with its attendant educational and outreach programs for passengers, was discontinued in 2007.

History

The Explorer of the Seas was completed in 2000 and has the capacity of 3,000 passengers.
An automated system for gathering data was installed in 2008.) She held that record until being overtaken by Navigator of the Seas in 2002. In early 2015, Explorer of the Seas received major upgrades, including the replacement of the inline skating rink with a Flowrider surfing simulator and increasing her tonnage to 138,194 GT. The ship's godmother is American athlete Jackie Joyner-Kersee.

In 2019 September, it was announced that the ship will get a refurbishment with $110 million in makeovers before its 2020 summer season. The refurbishment that was to take place under the amplification program in 2020 was delayed indefinitely due to the COVID pandemic, instead only technical refurbishment took place.

In July 2021, the ship was used to house some rescue workers and other officials involved in the rescue and recovery effort of the Surfside condominium building collapse.

Ports of call

In fall 2014, she sailed 5 to 9 day Caribbean cruises out of Port Canaveral, Florida. After dry-dock refurbishment in the spring of 2015, Explorer began to sail Northern Europe, Mediterranean, and Madeira, Azores and Canary Islands itineraries out of Southampton, Hampshire, United Kingdom.

From November 2015 to 23 April 2016 Explorer of the Seas was based in Sydney, Australia, for the summer cruise season. A 24-day cruise relocated the ship to Seattle for the summer 2016 season. In 2019 January, the ship brings 4,000 passengers to Wollongong.

Starting in 2021, Explorer of the Seas will sail out of San Juan and will be traveling through the southern Caribbean.

Accidents and incidents

Rescue of Tumbleweed 
On 16 February 2008, while en route from Bayonne, New Jersey, on a nine-day cruise to the Caribbean the bridge crew heard a faint mayday call over the radio.  This turned out to be the crew from Tumbleweed, a 39-foot sailing vessel, which had a planned sail from Baltimore to the Florida Keys.  The crew reportedly had a mechanical breakdown of both engine and sails.  The vessel drifted for 11 days to the location N32.35 W 72.49–roughly 275 miles southeast of North Carolina. Explorer of the Seas located and rescued the three men, who then departed the ship in Puerto Rico on 21 February 2008.

Crew overboard 
On 5 May 2010, 26-year-old bartender Satianand Buddaru was caught on surveillance jumping overboard. The ship turned around to rescue him but was unable to locate the bartender.

Norwegian Star collision 
On 14 September 2012, Explorer of the Seas was moored in Bermuda when heavy winds pushed Norwegian Cruise Line's Norwegian Star at its stern. Neither ship suffered any significant damage.

Norovirus outbreak
On 24 January 2014, 281 passengers and 22 crew members aboard Explorer of the Seas fell ill, reporting symptoms of vomiting and diarrhea. Due to the number of passengers sick, the Centers for Disease Control and Prevention sent a Sanitation Program Officer and an epidemiologist to the ship on Sunday, 26 January 2014, when it was docked in St. Thomas. By 27 January 2014 the number of ill increased to 564 passengers and 47 crew members and a decision was made to end the cruise early. After Explorer of the Seas returned to port, 684 of the 4,237 aboard had symptoms of norovirus.

Gastro outbreak 
On 16 December 2015, A total of 182 passengers out of the 3,566 on board Explorer of the Seas contracted infectious diarrhea. The ship's operator contacted South Eastern Sydney Local Health District before arriving in Sydney at 6am. None of the passengers were taken to hospital. It was also on this cruise that all of the passengers on board experienced a freak storm on 15 December 2015. During this storm the ship experienced a crosswind of 150 knots (277.8 km/h) and the ship listed to the port side by 10 degrees.

On 4 November 2019, the ship was forced to delay her arrival back in Southampton due to the heavy storms battering in the UK to Western Europe.

Coronavirus pandemic 
During the COVID-19 pandemic, the Centers for Disease Control and Prevention (CDC) reported that at least one passenger had tested positive for Severe acute respiratory syndrome coronavirus 2 within 14 days of disembarking from the ship on its voyage from 8 to 15 March 2020.

References

Further reading

External links 

 
 Voyager-Class.com - the largest online resource for information & pictures of the Voyager-class ships
 Miramar Ship Index - Explorer of the Seas

 

1999 ships
Maritime incidents in 2008
Maritime incidents in 2012
Maritime incidents in 2014
Ships of Royal Caribbean International
Ships built in Turku